Dhubulia Shayama Prasad Shikshayatan High School is located at Dhubulia, in Nadia district of West Bengal.

This is a co-education school for XI-XII. Beside this there is another girls school named Nivedita Balika Vidyalaya which is named in memoirs of Sister Nivedita. Between these two schools there is a big ground. The Dhubulia railway station is very near to the school and National Highway 34 is only 1.5 km away.

History
The school was named in memory of Dr. Syama Prasad Mukherjee.

See also
Education in India
List of schools in India
Education in West Bengal

References

External links 

High schools and secondary schools in West Bengal
Schools in Nadia district
Educational institutions in India with year of establishment missing